Utrechtse Sportvereniging Elinkwijk, known as USV Elinkwijk is a Dutch football club, based in Utrecht. It played professional football during the years 1955–1970. Marco van Basten was a player of the club during his youth years.

History
The club was founded in 1919. In 1970 DOS Utrecht, Elinkwijk and Velox merged in the club FC Utrecht. DOS Utrecht, Elinkwijk and Velox were refounded as amateurs clubs.

Elinkwijk played in the Hoofdklasse during the years 1974–1992 and 1996–2013.

Managers
 195X-1957 Gilbert Richmond
 1957–19XX Wim Groenendijk
 196-1966 Joop de Busser
 1966 Piet Dubbelman
 1966–1968 J de Bouter
 1968–1970 Evert Mur

References

External links

 

 

Football clubs in the Netherlands
Football clubs in Utrecht (city)
Association football clubs established in 1919
1919 establishments in the Netherlands